Global Wars Espectacular was a multi-promotional professional wrestling supershow tour co-produced by Ring of Honor (ROH) and Mexico's Consejo Mundial de Lucha Libre (CMLL) promotions. The tour spanned three dates, from September 6 through September 8. It made stops in Dearborn, Michigan; Villa Park, Illinois; and Milwaukee, Wisconsin. The events were shown live on Honor Club and FITE TV.

Background

Production
The U.S. based Ring of Honor (ROH) and the Mexico based Consejo Mundial de Lucha Libre (CMLL) Professional wrestling promotions started a working partnership in the mid-2010s, with ROH wrestlers travelling to Mexico to compete on CMLL shows and CMLL wrestlers working select shows in the U.S. for Ring of Honor. The two promotions have collaborated on supershow events over the year, such as the 2016 through 2019 International Gran Prix in Mexico, the Summer Supercard show in 2019, and the CMLL 85th Anniversary Show where ROH wrestler Matt Taven worked the main event.

In late July ROH announced that they had partnered with CMLL for a three day "Global Wars Espectacular" tour, as part of their annual Global Wars series of events. The three-stop tour would start on September 6, 2019 at the Ford Community Center in Dearborn, Michigan. The second stop, on September 7, will be at the Odeum Expo in Chicago and concluded at the Potawatomi Casino in Milwaukee on September 8. Several of the matches would feature ROH and CMLL wrestlers facing off, in additional to non-interpromotional matches.

Storylines
the Global Wars Espectecular tour will feature professional wrestling matches, involving different wrestlers from pre-existing scripted feuds, plots, and storylines that played out on ROH's television programs. Wrestlers portrayed villains (referred to as rudos in Mexico) or heroes (tecnicos) as they follow a series of events that build tension and culminate in a wrestling match or series of matches.

Matches

Global Wars Espectacular: Dearborn

Global Wars Espectacular: Villa Park

Global Wars Espectacular: Milwaukee

References

2019 in professional wrestling
Consejo Mundial de Lucha Libre co-promoted shows
Ring of Honor shows
Professional wrestling joint events
September 2019 events in the United States
Events in Milwaukee
Events in Villa Park, Illinois